Arnab Bhowmik (born 7 February 2003) is an Indian professional footballer who plays as a midfielder for Minerva Punjab in the I-League.

2003 births
Living people
Indian footballers
India youth international footballers
Association football midfielders
RoundGlass Punjab FC players
I-League players
People from Bardhaman
Footballers from West Bengal